Fong Chong Pik (1924 - 6 February 2004), also known as Fang Chuang Pi, was a political activist and member of the Communist Party of Malaya (CPM), otherwise known as the Malayan Communist Party (MCP).  He was the leader of the Singapore section of the Communist Party of Malaya.

Fong Chong Pik was given the nickname "The Plen" (for "plenipotentiary") in the 1950s by his then political nemesis, Lee Kuan Yew. In 1997, he urged Singapore's government to let former insurgents return to the country.

References

Sources
 news story from 1997

1924 births
2004 deaths
Malaysian politicians
Malaysian communists
Singaporean people of Teochew descent
Saint Andrew's School, Singapore alumni